Peter Joseph Boquel (March 6, 1873 – September 20, 1950) was a collegiate American football coach and physical director. He served as the head football coach at Saint John's University in Collegeville, Minnesota from 1903 to 1904, compiling a record of 3–2. He later served as an instructor at St. Mary's College in Marion County, Kentucky and as a physical director at Lehigh University in Allentown, Pennsylvania. Boquel died in 1950.

Head coaching record

References

External links
 

1873 births
1950 deaths
Lehigh University people
Saint John's Johnnies football coaches
Sportspeople from St. Louis